Martin Pemberton (born 1 February 1976) is an English football central defender who has played for many different professional clubs before moving to non-league side Farsley Celtic in spring 2005.

References

External links

1976 births
Living people
Footballers from Bradford
English footballers
Association football defenders
Oldham Athletic A.F.C. players
Doncaster Rovers F.C. players
Scunthorpe United F.C. players
Hartlepool United F.C. players
Bradford (Park Avenue) A.F.C. players
Mansfield Town F.C. players
Stockport County F.C. players
Rochdale A.F.C. players
Farsley Celtic A.F.C. players
English Football League players